Kasaji Airport  is an airstrip serving the town of Kasaji in Lualaba Province, Democratic Republic of the Congo.

See also

 Transport in the Democratic Republic of the Congo
 List of airports in the Democratic Republic of the Congo

References

External links
 OurAirports - Kasaji Airport
 FallingRain - Kasaji
 HERE Maps - Kasaji
 OpenStreetMap - Kasaji
 

Airports in Lualaba Province